is a national highway of Japan connecting the capitals of Aomori and Akita prefectures, Aomori and Akita in northern Japan, with a total length of . The majority of the highway travels along the coast of the Sea of Japan, paralleling the more inland National Route 7. The present-day highway largely follows the path of the Ōmagoe-kaidō, an Edo period road that linked the Kubota and Hirosaki feudal domains.

Route description

National Route 101 begins in central Aomori at the northern terminus of National Route 7 in front of Aoimori Park. The two national highways run parallel or concurrently all the way from Aomori to National Route 101's southern terminus in the city of Akita; however in the former town of Namioka, National Route 101 leaves National Route 7. It heads west, passing through the cities of Goshogawara and Tsugaru, until it meets the Sea of Japan coastline in the town of Ajigasawa. From there it travels along the western coast of Aomori and Akita prefectures, paralleling the more inland National Route 7.

The JR Gonō Line closely parallels the highway for much of its route. Also known as the Ōmagoe-kaidō, there are several attractions along the winding coastal portion of the highway including Furofushi Onsen and the World Heritage Site, Shirakami-Sanchi around the border between Aomori and Akita prefectures. The registration of Shirakami-Sanchi as a World Heritage Site has resulted in an increase in the average daily traffic levels along the highway.

History
Much of what is presently National Route 101 was preceded by the Ōmagoe-kaidō (大間越街道), a road established by the Tokugawa shogunate during the Edo period as a branch of the longer Ushū Kaidō (now known as national routes 7 and 13). It traveled between Hiyama-shukuba on the Ushū Kaidō in present-day Noshiro through the Kubota Domain to Hirosaki Castle in the Hirosaki Domain. A gate was set up between the two domains in 1618 to collect tolls and exchange goods. The highway was dubbed the Ōmagoe-kaidō during the Meiji period when the gate between the domains was abolished.

National Route 101 was established by the Cabinet of Japan between the city of Aomori and Noshiro, Akita in 1953 along pre-existing roads including most of the Ōmagoe-kaidō. By 1965, National Route 101 was certified to have been completed by the national government; however, in 1967 a  section of the highway at the border between Aomori and Akita prefectures was deemed to be to curvy and dangerous. The Noshiro Construction Office rebuilt the section with full funding from the national government. Upon the completion of the renovated section in March 1975, the highway's maintenance was handed back over to regional authorities. The highway and National Route 339 were routed along one-way streets in central Goshogawara from August 1977 to 30 August 1989, when the restrictions were lifted. In 1993, the southern terminus of the highway was moved further south from Noshiro to its current location in the city of Akita.

Incidents and closures
On 8 June 2018, Oibanasaki Tunnel in Oga, Akita was closed because the risk of a landslide was deemed too high following the collapse of a portion of the hillside adjacent to the entrance of the tunnel during heavy rains in May. The tunnel was reopened on 15 December 2020 following the completion of work to reinforce the tunnel as well as the slope alongside the tunnel entrance.

On 22 September 2018, a drunk driver that was traveling on the highway in the city of Tsugaru at a speed of  caused an incident that involved four cars. As a result of the incident, four people were killed and three were injured. The driver who caused the accident was given a 20-year prison sentence for vehicular homicide on 8 June 2020.

Major intersections

Auxiliary routes

Tsugaru Expressway

The Tsugaru Expressway is an incomplete two-lane national expressway in Aomori Prefecture that is signed as an auxiliary route of National Route 101. Its first section was established in 2002 and the expressway has been extended in stages since then. The expressway travels west from Aomori through the cities of Goshogawara and Tsugaru, where the main section of the expressway currently ends at an interchange with the main routing of National Route 101. A short expressway stub opened in Ajigasawa in 2016. The expressway is planned to be extended south through Fukaura to Happō in Akita Prefecture.

See also

References

External links

101
Roads in Akita Prefecture
Roads in Aomori Prefecture